The Inter-Parliamentary Union (IPU; , UIP) is an international organization of national parliaments. Its primary purpose is to promote democratic governance, accountability, and cooperation among its members; other initiatives include advancing gender parity among legislatures, empowering youth participation in politics, and sustainable development.

The organization was established in 1889 as the Inter-Parliamentary Congress. Its founders were statesmen Frédéric Passy of France and William Randal Cremer of the United Kingdom, who sought to create the first permanent forum for political multilateral negotiations. Initially, IPU membership was reserved for individual parliamentarians, but has since transformed to include the legislatures of sovereign states. As of 2020, the national parliaments of 179 countries are members of the IPU, while 13 regional parliamentary assemblies are associate members.

The IPU facilitates the development of international law and institutions, strengthening the foundations and enhancing the vision for peace and the common good, including the Permanent Court of Arbitration, the League of Nations, and the United Nations. It also sponsors and takes part in international conferences and forums, and has permanent observer status at the United Nations General Assembly. Consequently, eight individuals associated with the organization are Nobel Peace Prize laureates.

History

The organisation's initial objective was the arbitration of conflicts. The IPU played an important part in setting up the Permanent Court of Arbitration in The Hague. Over time, its mission has evolved towards the promotion of democracy and inter-parliamentary dialogue. The IPU has worked for establishment of institutions at the inter-governmental level, including the United Nations, an organization with which it cooperates and with which it has permanent observer status.

The headquarters of the union have been moved several times since its inception.
Locations:
1892–1911: Bern (Switzerland)
1911–1914: Brussels (Belgium)
1914–1920: Oslo (Norway)
1921–present: Geneva (Switzerland)

Eight leading personalities of the IPU have received Nobel Peace Prizes:

1901: Frédéric Passy (France)
1902: Charles Albert Gobat (Switzerland)
1903: Randal Cremer (United Kingdom)
1908: Fredrik Bajer (Denmark)
1909: Auguste Marie François Beernaert (Belgium)
1913: Henri La Fontaine (Belgium)
1921: Christian Lange (Norway)
1927: Ferdinand Buisson (France)

Members and organization

Members

 Regional parliamentary assemblies  may be admitted by the Governing Council as Associate Members
 Every Parliament constituted in conformity with the laws of a sovereign State whose population it represents and on whose territory it functions may request affiliation to the Inter-Parliamentary Union. The decision to admit or readmit a Parliament shall be taken by the Governing Council.

It is the duty of the Members of the IPU to submit the resolutions of the IPU within their respective Parliament, in the most appropriate form; to communicate them to the Government; to stimulate their implementation and to inform the IPU Secretariat, as often and fully as possible, particularly in its annual reports, as to the steps taken and the results obtained.

As it can be seen on the map, mostly all the countries in the world have a parliament member of IPU, with the notable exception of the United States, although the 12th (1904), the 23rd (1925) and the 42nd (1953) conferences were hosted in the US.

Associate Members
The participating parliamentary assemblies other than national parliaments are the following:

Organs 

The organs of the Inter-Parliamentary Union are:

 Assembly. Meeting biannually, the Assembly is composed of parliamentarians designated as delegates by the Members. The Assembly is assisted in its work by Standing Committees, whose number and terms of reference are determined by the Governing Council; Standing Committees shall normally prepare reports and draft resolutions for the Assembly. No one delegate may record more than ten votes.
 Governing Council. The Governing Council normally holds two sessions a year. The Governing Council is composed of three representatives from each Member. The term of office of a member of the Governing Council lasts from one Assembly to the next and all the members of the Governing Council must be sitting members of Parliament. The Governing Council elects the President of the Inter-Parliamentary Union for a period of three years. It also elects the members of the executive committee and appoints the Secretary General of the Union. 
 Executive Committee. The executive committee is composed of the President of the Inter-Parliamentary Union, 15 members belonging to different Parliaments (elected by the Governing Council; not less than 12 are elected from among the members of the Governing Council) and the President of the Coordinating Committee of the Meeting of Women Parliamentarians. The fifteen elected seats are assigned to the geopolitical groups. Only parliamentarians from States where women have both the right to vote and the right to stand for election are eligible to the executive committee. The executive committee is the administrative organ of the Inter-Parliamentary Union. The current President is Gabriela Cuevas Barron of Mexico, who was elected to a three-year mandate in October 2017 at the 201st session of the Governing Council of the IPU in Geneva.
 Secretariat. The Secretariat constitutes the totality of the staff of the organisation under the direction of the Secretary General, currently Martin Chungong of Cameroon.

The Association of Secretaries General of Parliaments is a consultative body of the Inter-Parliamentary Union.

Conferences 

The IPU Assembly (formerly known as the Inter-Parliamentary Conference) is the principal statutory body that expresses the views of the Inter-Parliamentary Union on political issues.

Presidents

Amendments to the Statutes 
Any proposal to amend the Statutes shall be submitted in writing to the Secretariat of the Union at least three months before the meeting of the Assembly. The Secretariat will immediately communicate all such proposals to the Members of the Union. The consideration of such proposed amendments shall be automatically placed on the agenda of the Assembly.

Any sub-amendments shall be submitted in writing to the Secretariat of the Union at least six weeks before the meeting of the Assembly. The Secretariat will immediately communicate all such sub-amendments to the Members of the Union.

After hearing the opinion of the Governing Council, expressed through a simple majority vote, the Assembly shall decide on such proposals by a two-thirds majority vote.

The IPU and the United Nations

The IPU marked the 50th anniversary of the United Nations, in 1995, by holding a special session in the General Assembly Hall before the start of the session, where they planned for closer cooperation with the United Nations.  The General Assembly Resolution passed during that session requested the Secretary-General to put this into action.  An agreement was signed between the IPU and the Secretary-General on 24 July 1996 and subsequently ratified by a General Assembly Resolution, where the United Nations recognizes IPU as the world organization of parliaments. Pursuant to this resolution, the Secretary-General submitted a report which was noted with appreciation by the General Assembly, who requested further strengthening of cooperation and another report.  This report detailed the measures that had been taken, including opening a liaison office in New York, and cooperation on issues such land-mines and the promotion of representative democracy.  Following an entire morning of debate the General Assembly passed a resolution which simply stated that it "looks forward to continued close cooperation".

The following year (1999) the Secretary-General reported on an increased number of areas of cooperation, the issue was debated for an entire afternoon (interrupted by a minute of silence held for tribute to Vazgen Sargsyan, the Prime Minister of Armenia who had just at that time been killed by gunmen), and passed a resolution requesting the IPU be allowed to address the Millennium General Assembly directly.

Following another report, and another half-day debate, the General Assembly welcomed the IPU declaration entitled "The Parliamentary vision for international cooperation at the dawn of the third millennium" and called for the Secretary-General to explore new and further ways in which the relationship could be strengthened.

On 19 November 2002 the IPU was granted observer status to the General Assembly.

In the Resolution 59/19, Cooperation between the United Nations and the Inter-Parliamentary Union, the UN General Assembly takes note of the recommendations in regard to engaging parliamentarians more systematically in the work of
the United Nations.

The final declaration of the Second World Conference of Speakers of Parliament, hosted at United Nations headquarters, took place in September 2005, was entitled Bridging the democracy gap in international relations: A stronger role for parliament.

In the Resolution adopted by the UN General Assembly, 61/6, Cooperation between the United Nations and the Inter-Parliamentary Union, on 27 November 2006, it calls for the further development of the annual parliamentary hearing at the United Nations and other specialized parliamentary meetings in the context of major United Nations meetings as joint United Nations-Inter-Parliamentary Union events.

Every year during the fall session of the General Assembly the IPU organises a Parliamentary Hearing.  A resolution on cooperation between the United Nations and the IPU allowed for circulation of official IPU documents in the General Assembly.

UN and the IPU cooperate closely in various fields, in particular peace and security, economic and social development, international law, human rights, and democracy and gender issues, but IPU has not obtained the status of UN General Assembly subsidiary organ.

Fourth World Conference of Speakers of Parliament 
The fourth world conference on UN 70th anniversary marked by Ban Ki-Moon as "UN70" was organised in September 2015 where Speakers of all IPU(Inter-Parliamentary Union) member parliaments and of non-member parliaments were invited from across the world. The theme was on peace, democracy, and development.

United Nations reports, resolutions, and agreements

Resolution of the United Nations: Cooperation between the United Nations and the Inter-Parliamentary Union, 27 November 2006.
Report of the United Nations Secretary-General: Cooperation between the United Nations and regional and other organizations, 16 August 2006.
Resolution of the United Nations General Assembly: Cooperation between the United Nations and the Inter-Parliamentary Union, 8 November 2004.
 Report of the United Nations Secretary-General: Cooperation between the United Nations and the Inter-Parliamentary Union (see Part 5 of the Annex), 1 September 2004.
 Resolution adopted by the General Assembly: Cooperation between the United Nations and the Inter-Parliamentary Union, 21 November 2002.
 Resolution adopted by the General Assembly: Observer status for the Inter-Parliamentary Union in the General Assembly, 19 November 2002.
 Report of the United Nations Secretary-General: Cooperation between the United Nations and the Inter-Parliamentary Union, 3 September 2002.
 Cooperation Agreement between the United Nations and the Inter-Parliamentary Union of 1996.

See also
Inter-parliamentary institution
e-democracy
Global democracy
Third World Conference of Speakers of Parliament
International Day of Democracy
Internationalism (politics)
List of peace activists
Millennium Development Goals
Supranational union
Sustainable Development Goals
United Nations Democracy Fund
United Nations Parliamentary Assembly
United Nations Department of Economic and Social Affairs (UNDESA)

Notes

References

External links
 
 Cooperation with the United Nations at official website
 The Inter-Parliamentary Union (1968)
 Parliaments Across Frontiers: A Short History of the Inter-Parliamentary Union (1976)
 

 
Elections
Parliamentary assemblies
United Nations General Assembly observers
Organizations established in 1889
Organisations based in Geneva
1889 establishments in Switzerland
Peace organizations